Ischiochaetus is a genus of flies in the family Dolichopodidae, found in New Zealand. The genus was originally named by Octave Parent in 1933. However, as the genus was not designated a type species, this name was unavailable until 1989, when Daniel J. Bickel and C. E. Dyte designated Ischiochaetus ornatipes as the type species.

Species
 Ischiochaetus lenis Parent, 1933
 Ischiochaetus ornatipes Parent, 1933
 Ischiochaetus rotundicornis Parent, 1933
 Ischiochaetus spinosus Parent, 1933

References 

Sympycninae
Dolichopodidae genera
Diptera of New Zealand
Endemic insects of New Zealand